Shathru is a 2013 Indian Kannada-language film directed by JK, starring Prem Kumar and  Dimple Chopade in lead roles.

Cast

 Prem Kumar as Vijay Surya 
 Dimple Chopade
 Rangayana Raghu
 Sharath Lohitashwa as Adisesha
 Ramesh Bhat
 Bullet Prakash
 Tabla Nani
 Suresh Mangalore as an honest constable

Music

Reception 
The Times of India scored the film at 3 out of 5 stars and wrote "Prem, known for romantic and soft roles, shines even in police officer’s role. Dimple Chopra has nothing much to do. Suresh Mangalore impresses you with honest constable’s role. Music by Sujith Shetty and camera by Mathew Rajan and GNV Seetharam are okay". Sify wrote" Dimple Chopde adds to the glamour quotient of the movie. However, she has been completely wasted as an actress. As usual, Rangayana Raghu and Sharath Lohitashwa excel in their roles. Music by Arjun Janya does not live up to the expectations. The songs are forgettable". Bangalore Mirror wrote "To justify the ugly side of the baddie, there are a few murders and rapes. Cliches crop up at regular intervals, like the character of a lunatic who runs around the village revealing all the secrets of the villain. However, the film is a welcome change for Prem who has long been stuck in stereotypical roles as a lover boy. He does not disappoint, but the film does, to a large extent".

References

2010s Kannada-language films
2013 films